Neostorena is a genus of spiders in the family Zodariidae. It was first described in 1914 by William Joseph Rainbow. , it contains 7 species from Australia.

Species
Neostorena comprises the following species:
 N. grayi Jocqué, 1991 — Australia (New South Wales)
 N. minor Jocqué, 1991 — Australia (Queensland, New South Wales)
 N. spirafera (L. Koch, 1872) — Australia (Queensland)
 N. torosa (Simon, 1908) — Australia (Western Australia)
 N. venatoria Rainbow, 1914 (type) — Australia (Victoria)
 N. victoria Jocqué, 1991 — Australia (Victoria)
 N. vituperata Jocqué, 1995 — Australia (Queensland)

References

Zodariidae
Araneomorphae genera
Spiders of Australia
Taxa named by William Joseph Rainbow
Spiders described in 1914